Captain Maurice Douglas Guest Scott  (13 November 1895 – 17 March 1918) was a British World War I flying ace credited with twelve official victories, including one observation balloon, while a member of the Royal Flying Corps. He scored as both an aerial observer and a pilot; he was successful while serving with three different squadrons.

Early life
Scott was born in Mussoorie, Bengal Presidency, India, the second son of Philip William Scott (1865–1910), a civil engineer employed by the Eastern Bengal Railway, and Agnes Mary (née Kirkham) (1865–1932). Following his father's death the family returned to England. In the 1911 census he is recorded as living in Bedford with his mother, his brother Percy (1893–1914), and his aunt Emily, but by 1914 the family were resident in Borrowash, Derbyshire.

His name appears on the War Memorial at Derby station for No. 8 Shop, Derby, suggesting that he also worked for the Midland Railway.

World War I service
After serving as a cadet in the Officers' Training Corps, Scott was commissioned as a temporary second lieutenant (on probation) in the 3rd Battalion, The Loyal North Lancashire Regiment on 14 November 1914. He was confirmed in his rank on 1 October 1915.

Scott was seconded to the Royal Flying Corps in February 1916, and after completing his aerial gunnery training was appointed a flying officer (observer) on 21 May. He was posted to No. 18 Squadron to fly in the Vickers Gunbus two-seater fighter. On 3 April 1916, he was credited with capturing a German two-seater reconnaissance aircraft at Souchez.

He would subsequently train as a pilot, being appointed a flying officer on 16 October 1916, with seniority from 21 May. He was then posted to No. 54 Squadron to fly the Sopwith Pup single-seat fighter. On 5 April 1917, he shared with Frank Hudson, Reginald Charley, and another pilot, in the destruction of a German observation balloon. On 9 May 1917, he destroyed another enemy two-seater. Two days later, Scott shared with William Strugnell, Oliver Sutton, and three other squadron mates, in the destruction of an enemy reconnaissance aircraft. On 1 June, Scott and Sutton drove an Albatros D.III fighter down out of control over Honnecourt, and Scott became an ace.

He subsequently transferred to No. 46 Squadron and was appointed a flight commander, with the acting rank of captain, on 21 June 1917.

He began a string of seven wins on 4 September 1917, sharing with four others in the driving down of an Albatros two-seater south of Scarpe. He would gain six more wins that month, destroying a DFW reconnaissance aircraft, and driving down two Albatros D.Vs and two German reconnaissance aircraft. He was awarded the Military Cross on 27 October 1917. On 8 October 1917, he was relieved from combat duty to return to Home Establishment, where on 1 November 1917 he was appointed a Group Instructor in Gunnery (graded as a flight commander).

Scott was killed in a flying accident at Shoreham, Sussex, on 17 March 1918, and is buried at All Saints' Church, Ockbrook, Derbyshire.

List of aerial victories

Honours and awards
Military Cross
Lieutenant (Temporary Captain) Maurice Douglas Guest Scott, North Lancashire Regiment, Special Reserve, and Royal Flying Corps.
"For conspicuous gallantry and devotion to duty in aerial combats. On one occasion his patrol encountered seven enemy machines, two of which he drove down out of control. He has destroyed eleven enemy aeroplanes, and proved himself a very dashing patrol leader."

References
Notes

Bibliography
 

1895 births
1918 deaths
People from Mussoorie
Loyal Regiment officers
Royal Flying Corps officers
British World War I flying aces
Recipients of the Military Cross
Aviators killed in aviation accidents or incidents in England
British military personnel killed in World War I
Military personnel of British India
British Army personnel of World War I